Xeroplexa scabiosula is a species of air-breathing land snail, a terrestrial pulmonate gastropod mollusk in the family Geomitridae. 

Although this species was named by Locard (1899), it was treated as synonym of X. belemensis by Gittenberger (1993).

Description 
Shells very similar to those of X. arrabidensis and X. belemensis, with a relatively large umbilicus, but shell breadth smaller at maturity and ribs on dorsal surface of body whorl less developed (absent or very weak).

Distribution 
Endemic to Portugal (western Iberian Peninsula), where restricted to limestone districts of central Algarve.

References

External links 
 http://luisjavierchueca.com/research-3/candidula-s-l/

scabiosula
Molluscs of Europe
Gastropods described in 1899